John Dixon Butler  (December 1860 – 27 October 1920) was a British architect and surveyor who had a long, professional association with London's Metropolitan Police. During his 20-year career with the police, he completed the designs and alterations to around 200 police buildings, including ten courts; as of 2022, about 58 of his buildings survive. Historic England describes him as "one of the most accomplished Metropolitan Police architects" and have included around 25 of his buildings on the National Historic List of England and Wales.

Dixon Butler was born in London and studied architecture under Richard Norman Shaw, with whom he would later work on the designs for Canon Row Police Station (1898), and the Scotland Yard (south building) (1906) on London's Embankment. Dixon Butler took over the role of architect and surveyor to the Metropolitan Police from his father in 1895. Dixon Butler's designs were usually in a domestic style, sensitive to the context of newly-developed suburban areas in which stations were often located, but with strong municipal qualities such as iron railings, inscribed lintels identifying the building as a police station, and other stone dressings.

Elected a fellow of the Royal Institute of British Architects (RIBA) in 1906, Dixon Butler moved to Surrey with his wife where he died in 1920.

Early life
Dixon Butler was born in December 1860 at 11 Redcliffe Gardens, Chelsea, London.  He was the only son and the second of two children to John Butler (1828–1900), an architect and surveyor, and his wife, Hannah  Deavin. Dixon Butler studied at University College London and then the Architectural Association, before being articled to his father, from whom he learnt about the design and planning of police buildings.

Dixon Butler's father was appointed as the Surveyor to the Metropolitan Police in 1881; upon his retirement in 1895, Dixon Butler succeeded him in the role. Both father and son worked under Richard Norman Shaw on the designs for Scotland Yard; Butler on the North building, Dixon Butler on the South. The position was later reversed at Canon Row on London's Embankment, on which Dixon Butler was the lead architect and Norman Shaw acted as consultant.

Surveyor to the Metropolitan Police
The Metropolitan Police Force Surveyorship was established in 1842; the force's first purpose-built station was built at Bow Street, erected two years after Sir Robert Peel's Metropolitan Police Act of 1829. There was a boom in police stations during the 1880s following the political unrest of that decade and high-profile events such as the Whitechapel Murders. Cherry, O'Brien and Pevsner, in their London: East volume of the Buildings of England series, record Dixon Butler's "unique" riverside police stations for the Thames River Police, founded in 1798 to combat piracy, including his station at Wapping which now houses the Thames River Police Museum.

Under Dixon Butler, after 1895, police station interiors in London became more domesticated and an effort was made to make them more approachable to the public, including their relocation into more public areas. After a violent demonstration outside the station in Bow Street, the Metropolitan Police decided to have separate entrances at their stations for constables, away from the public, and to have officers live at the stations under the supervision of senior colleagues. Extra provisions were also made for the care of prisoners, including the introduction of ablution areas and exercise yards. Externally, Dixon Butler was careful to design them in a similar style to the surrounding, newly developed suburban areas in which they served.

Dixon Butler's designs included features which give his buildings strong municipal accents, such as iron railings and lintels inscribed "Police" or "Police Station", set in stone dressings, and his frequent use of elaborate consoles to doors and windows. These elements give his designs their architectural quality creating a "characteristic type which can be recognised all over London". Historic England describes him as "one of the most accomplished Metropolitan Police architects".

Buildings

Dixon Butler completed about 200 buildings during his career, nearly all police stations, and around 10 courthouses; around 58 buildings survive. He designed Northwood Police Station in the Old English style, sensitive to the fact that at that time, Northwood was semi-rural, whilst acknowledging the proximity to London, through its station on the London Underground Metropolitan line. He designed similar police stations at Pinner and Kew, with the one at Pinner, designed in 1897, being the most domesticated of all his stations; it was equipped with living quarters for a married sergeant and his family, including two bedrooms, a living room, a scullery and a larder, a lobby, waiting room, inspector's office, charge room, parade room, three cells, a stable for two horses and an attached ambulance shed.

A number of Dixon Butler's existing buildings have been converted to other uses, including three, Tower Bridge Magistrates Court and Police Station (now The Dixon), Marlborough Street Magistrates Court (now The Courthouse Hotel) and Shoreditch Magistrates Court and Police Station (now The Courthouse, Shoreditch), which have been converted to hotels.  Historic England have included 32 of these buildings on the National Historic List of England and Wales. All are listed Grade II, with the exception of Canon Row Police Station which is given the higher grading of II*.

Known existing buildings

1895–6 - Willesden Police Station, 96 High Road, Willesden, NW10 2PP. 
1896 – Former Holborn Police Station, 70 Grays Inn Road (junction with Theobalds Road, adjoining Lambs Conduit Street), Holborn, London Borough of Camden, WC1N 3NR. 
1896–1906 – Former New Scotland Yard, Norman Shaw South Building (assisting Richard Norman Shaw). Designed 1896-98, built 1904-06.
1897 – Pinner Police Station, 1 Waxwell Lane, Pinner.
1898 – Camberwell Police Station, Church Street, Camberwell.
1898–1902 – Canon Row Police Station, Canon Row, Whitehall.
1899 – Lewisham Police Station, Ladywell Lane, Lewisham.
1900 – Woodford Bridge Police Station, Chigwell Road.
1900 - Wimbledon Police Station, 15-23 Queens Road, Wimbledon.
1900–1902 – Hyde Park Police Station.
1901 – Victoria Police Station, 63 Rochester Row, City of Westminster.  Now occupied by private apartments.
1902 – Sidcup Police Station, 87 Main Road, Sidcup. Closed in 2014, now a pizza restaurant.
1903 – Old Street Magistrates Court and adjoining Police Station, 335 and 337 Old Street, London Borough of Hackney.
1903 - Lee Road Police Station, 418 Lee High Road, London Borough of Lewisham. Closed in 2003, now residential accommodation.
1903 – Bow Police Station, 111 Bow Road, Tower Hamlets.
1903–1904 – Victoria Magistrates Court, 69 Rochester Row, City of Westminster.
1904 – East Ham Police Station, High Street South, East Ham, London Borough of Newham. Closed in 2014. Sold for development in 2018.
1904 – Gates and Piers to entrance to Derby Gate
1904 – Lower Clapton Police Station.
1904 – North Woolwich Police Station, Albert Road.
1904 – Hackney Police Station, Lower Clapton Road. (closed 2013)
1905 - Fore Street Police Station, 314 Fore Street, Upper Edmonton, Enfield.
1906 – Ilford Hill Police Station, Ilford.
1906 – Clerkenwell Magistrates Court, 76 King's Cross Road, Clerkenwell. Now a hostel.
1906 – Shoreditch Magistrates Court and Police Station.
1906 – Tower Bridge Magistrates Court and adjoining Police Station.
1907 - Battersea Police Station, Battersea Bridge Road, Wandsworth.
1907 – Wood Green Police Station, 347 High Road, Wood Green.
1907 – Wapping Police Station, 98-102 Wapping High Street, Wapping.
1908 – Sutton Police Station, Carshalton Road, Sutton.
1908–1909 – Wealdstone Police Station, 55 High Street, Harrow.
1909 – Greenwich Magistrates Court.
1909–1910 – Police Section House, 40 Beak Street, Soho, demolished prior to 2018 to make way for office space.
1910 – Woolwich Police Station, Market Street, Woolwich.
1910 – Ripple Road Police Station, Barking.
1910–11 - Northwood Police Station, 2 Murray Road, Northwood, Hillingdon.
1911 – Harrow Road Police Station.
1912 - Deptford Police Station, 114-116 Amersham Vale, Deptford, SE14 6LG. Closed in 2017. Domestic housing proposed.
1912 – Streatham Police Station, Streatham High Road, Streatham Hill, Merton. Closed in 2014 and sold for redevelopment. Empty, as of 2022.
1912 – Plaistow Police Station, Barking Road, Plaistow.
1912 - Battersea Police Station, Battersea Bridge Road, Battersea, ST17 0LG. 
1912 – Hampstead Police Station, court house.
1912 – Woolwich Magistrates Court,Calderwood Street, Woolwich. now flats.
1912–1913 – No. 19-21 Great Marlborough Street, Westminster (court and police station)
1913 Tottenham High Road,Tottenham.
1913–1916 – Marlborough Street Magistrates Court.
1914 - Kew Police Station, 96 North Road, Kew, London Borough of Richmond-upon-Thames. Closed in 1933 as part of a reorganisation of the police estate, by Hugh Trenchard, the then Commissioner of Police of the Metropolis.
1914 – West London Magistrates Court, 181 Talgarth Road, Hammersmith
1915 - Winchmore Hill Police Station, 687 Greens Lane, Winchmore Hill, Enfield.
1916 – Golders Green Police Station, 1069 Finchley Road, Golders Green, NW11 0QE.
1917 – Former police station, 458 Bethnal Green Road (facade and enlargements to an existing building designed by his father, John Butler, in 1892).
1920–1925 – Former Police Station and Magistrates Court, Aylward Street and East Arbour Street, Mile End - now flats. Designed by Dixon Butler, who died early on into the project; finished by his successor, Gilbert Mackenzie Trench.

Personal life and death
In his spare time Dixon Butler was actively engaged in amateur dramatics. In an April 1890 edition of the Croydon Guardian and Surrey County Gazette, he is shown as being part of the Selwood Operatic Company, and performing in a small concert in aid of St James's Church, Croydon. Five years later, according to The Stage, he, along with a group of other architects, including George Baron Carvill, took part in a production of King Arthur  at the London Scottish Reserves HQ in Buckingham Gate. The play was advertised as being "a burlesque written for architects by architects" and featured an architectural-themed twist to its plot; the part of the King (played by Dixon Butler) was a district surveyor who had, under his care, three articled pupils, Sirs Lancelot (Albert L. Harris) Mordred (Herbert Phillips Fletcher, brother to Banister Fletcher) and Percival (C.V Cable).

Like his father, Dixon Butler was an active Freemason and became a member of the Baldwin Lodge in Dalton-in-Furness on 11 June 1890; five years later, he was initiated at the Mount Moriah Lodge, Tower Hill. He married Hannah Frazer (1854–1924) in March 1901; they had no children. He was elected a fellow of the Royal Institute of British Architects (RIBA) in 1906.

Dixon Butler retired to Molesey, Surrey, where he died on 27 October 1920. He was interred in the churchyard of St John's in Woking. His former Tower Bridge Police Station and Court, now a hotel, is named The Dixon in commemoration of his life and works.

Notes

References

Sources

External links
 Article on the Chadwell Heath Police Station published by Epping Forest District Museum
 Drawings and plans by Dixton Butler for the Wealdstone Police Station and Petty Sessional Court

1860 births
1920 deaths
Fellows of the Royal Institute of British Architects
19th-century English architects
20th-century English architects